Larry Campbell (born February 21, 1955) is an American multi-instrumentalist who plays many stringed instruments (including guitar, mandolin, pedal steel guitar, slide guitar, and violin) in genres including country, folk, blues, and rock. He is perhaps best known for his time as part of Bob Dylan's Never Ending Tour band from 1997 to 2004.

Campbell also has extensive experience as a studio musician. Over the past years, he has recorded with such artists as Levon Helm, Judy Collins, Lucy Kaplansky, Richard Shindell, Linda Thompson, Sheryl Crow, Chris Castle, Paul Simon, B. B. King, Willie Nelson, Eric Andersen, Buddy and Julie Miller, Kinky Friedman, Little Feat, Hot Tuna, Cyndi Lauper, k.d. lang, Anastasia Barzee, Rosanne Cash and Ayọ, among others.

Biography 
During the 1970s and 1980s, Campbell performed regularly on New York City's burgeoning country music scene, at well-known venues such as Greenwich Village's legendary Lone Star Cafe, City Limits, The Rodeo Bar, and O'Lunney's, near the United Nations. He contributed his talents to several musicals.

Beginning in the late 1970s, Campbell was also a member of The Woodstock Mountains Revue, a unique folk group that featured Artie & Happy Traum, Pat Alger, Jim Rooney, Bill Keith, John Herald, Eric Andersen and John Sebastian.

In 1982, Campbell performed in the orchestra for Alaska – The Musical, playing fiddle, acoustic and electric guitar, pedal steel and banjo. Campbell also performed in the orchestra for Big River in 1985, and Rhythm Ranch in 1989. In addition, he played pedal steel guitar, banjo, fiddle and guitar for the entire run of The Will Rogers Follies, which opened on Broadway on May 1, 1991.

Campbell was a member of Bob Dylan's "Never Ending Tour" band from March 31, 1997, until November 21, 2004. Through his association with Dylan's bass player Tony Garnier, Campbell joined the band, replacing John Jackson as a guitarist, and expanded the role to multi-instrumentalist, playing instruments such as cittern, violin/fiddle, pedal steel guitar, lap steel guitar, mandolin, banjo, and slide guitar. 

Since Campbell's departure from Dylan's band, he has continued to make guest appearances with various artists and live acts including Peter Wolf, Elvis Costello, Emmylou Harris, Rosanne Cash, Furthur, and Phil and Friends. He has also produced albums for many artists, including most recently Jorma Kaukonen.

Campbell toured regularly with Levon Helm, in addition to producing Helm's two Grammy-winning albums, Dirt Farmer and Electric Dirt, and acting as the musical director for Helm's Midnight Ramble concerts.

Campbell played banjo, fiddle, and pedal steel on The Black Crowes 2009 album Before the Frost...Until the Freeze. He also appears on the Outlaw Country band Whitey Morgan and the 78's recorded at Levon Helm's studio in December 2009 and January 2010, and Last Bird Home by Chris Castle, also recorded at Levon's studio in 2011.

Campbell played guitar, pedal steel, banjo, slide, mandolin, and fiddle on Dan Brenner's 2011 album Little Dark Angel produced by ten-time Grammy winner Jay Newland. Campbell and his wife, Teresa, released a self-titled album on June 23, 2015, on Red House Records.

In 2019, Campbell and his wife filled in for Little Feat guitarist Paul Barrere during the band's 50th Anniversary Tour. The duo played with the band for most of the tour, from October 7–24, with Scott Sharrard taking over for the tour's last two dates on October 26 and 27, 2019. The duo's stint with Little Feat came shortly before Barrere's death on October 26, 2019.

Personal life 
Campbell is married to singer Teresa Williams. For several years, Campbell was musical director and bandleader for the Levon Helm Band during their Midnight Ramble concerts. On September 18, 2008, at the 7th Annual Americana Music Association Honors and Awards Show, Campbell was presented with The Award for Lifetime Achievement for an Instrumentalist.

On March 24, 2020, Campbell's wife, Teresa Williams, announced that he had been diagnosed with COVID-19 amidst the COVID-19 pandemic. Subsequent reports indicate he recovered from the illness.

Discography 
Larry Campbell has contributed to many albums by various musical artists.  This is a partial list.
We Won't Dance – The Greg Trooper Band – 1986
Picture Perfect Morning – Edie Brickell – 1994
Cover Girl – Shawn Colvin – 1994
Cry Cry Cry – Cry Cry Cry – 1998
Love and Theft – Bob Dylan – 2001
23rd St. Lullaby – Patti Scialfa – 2004
Rooftops – Larry Campbell – 2005
Live at the Warfield – Phil Lesh and Friends – 2006
Dirt Farmer – Levon Helm – 2007
River of Time – Jorma Kaukonen – 2009
Electric Dirt – Levon Helm – 2009
Before the Frost...Until the Freeze – The Black Crowes – 2009
You Can Always Turn Around – Lucky Peterson – 2010
Wood and Stone – Tara Nevins – 2010
Whitey Morgan and the 78's – Whitey Morgan and the 78's – 2010
Steady as She Goes – Hot Tuna – 2011
Love for Levon: A Benefit to Save the Barn – various artists – 2013
Only Slightly Mad – David Bromberg Band – 2013
Ain't In No Hurry – Jorma Kaukonen – 2015
Larry Campbell & Teresa Williams – Larry Campbell and Teresa Williams – 2015
The Blues, the Whole Blues, and Nothing But the Blues – David Bromberg Band – 2016

References

External links 
Larry Campbell Interview – Country Music Pride
Larry Campbell site at members.cox.net
Larry Campbell from Bob Dylan Who's Who pages
 Lifetime achievement award for Larry Campbell.

1955 births
Living people
American country guitarists
American country singers
American folk guitarists
American male guitarists
American multi-instrumentalists
American rock guitarists
Songwriters from New York (state)
Pedal steel guitarists
Slide guitarists
American mandolinists
Guitarists from New York City
20th-century American guitarists
Country musicians from New York (state)
20th-century American male musicians
American male songwriters